Frédéric Laurent Page (born 28 December 1978) is a Swiss former professional footballer who played as a centre-back.

Career
Page had been a member of FC Aarau youth team and made his debut in the  1996–97 season. Over the next six years he became a regular at Brugglifeld, making a total of 145 appearances and scoring six goals. Page signed an improved two-year contract in summer 2002, but one year later he left for Germany. He spent the next four years playing in the 2. Bundesliga, first at Union Berlin, followed by two seasons at SpVgg Greuther Fürth and finally a season at SpVgg Unterhaching.

In the summer of 2007, he was re-signed by FC Aarau, on a contract until 30 June 2009.  After his time at Aarau, Page spent two years with Neuchâtel Xamax before signing with FC Lausanne-Sport on 8 July 2011. He left Lausanne after one season, rejoining former club Neuchâtel Xamax. He retired at the end of the 2012–13 season.

References

External links
 
 

1978 births
Living people
People from Kulm District
Association football central defenders
Swiss men's footballers
FC Aarau players
1. FC Union Berlin players
SpVgg Greuther Fürth players
SpVgg Unterhaching players
Neuchâtel Xamax FCS players
FC Lausanne-Sport players
Swiss Super League players
2. Bundesliga players
Swiss expatriate footballers
Swiss expatriate sportspeople in Germany
Expatriate footballers in Germany
Sportspeople from Aargau